KWSM-LD, virtual channel 32 (UHF digital channel 20), is a low-powered Estrella TV-affiliated television station licensed to Santa Maria, California, United States. The station is owned by Cocola Broadcasting.

Subchannels
The station's digital signal is multiplexed:

External links
 
 Cocola Broadcasting

WSM-LD
Television channels and stations established in 1999
Low-power television stations in the United States
1999 establishments in California